The Ctenophorinae are a subfamily of Tipulidae, the true crane flies. Most species are large, colourful crane flies.

Genera
Ctenophora Meigen, 1803
Dictenidia Brulle, 1833
Phoroctenia Coquillett, 1910
Pselliophora Osten Sacken, 1887
Tanyptera Latreille, 1804

References

Tipulidae
Nematocera subfamilies